Pinball Illusions is an Amiga and MS-DOS pinball video game developed by  Digital Illusions CE (DICE) in 1995 as a sequel of Pinball Fantasies and Pinball Dreams.

The original Amiga release featured three tables. The PC CD version added a fourth, "The Vikings" (this was written for the Amiga version but not considered good enough for inclusion). This was the first version of the series to feature more than 1 ball in play at a time (known as 'multiball'), and the first to be released for AGA based Amigas. The game also marks its nationality as a Swedish product in "The Vikings" table (at the top left corner).

The game was ranked the 23rd best game of all time by Amiga Power in 1996. Maximum scored the PC version three out of five stars. They said the four tables are "all excellent in their own way" but that the game lacks the imagination and innovation of other pinball video games. They concluded it to be "solid, if uninspiring, entertainment."

Digital Illusions used the four tables from this game to produce True Pinball on the Sega Saturn and Sony PlayStation, which presented the tables in a more realistic perspective.

Pinball World
Pinball World was released on DOS just after Pinball Illusions. It has nine pinball tables: Africa, Australia, Far East, Germany, Hollywood, United Kingdom, New York, North Pole, and South America. It was developed and written by Spidersoft. Coming Soon Magazine gave it 90 out of 100, PC Joker gave it 68 out of 100, PC Player (Germany) gave it 68 out of 100, Power Play gave it 57 out of 100, Joystick (French) gave it 50 out of 100, PC Games (Germany) gave it 45 out of 100, Computer Gaming World (CGW) gave it 2 Stars, and High Score gave it 1 out of 5.

References 

1995 video games
Amiga games
Amiga 1200 games
Amiga CD32 games
Digital Illusions CE games
DOS games
Pinball video games
Video game sequels
Video games developed in Sweden
Video games scored by Olof Gustafsson